Dioryctria ebeli, the south coastal coneworm moth, is a species of moth of the family Pyralidae. It is found in the US states of Florida, the southern parts of South Carolina, Georgia, Alabama, Massachusetts, and south-eastern Louisiana.

The larvae feed on Pinus species. They generally feed on the developing cones of their host plant, but are occasionally also found on young growing tips of branches. In the winter, they have been recorded on galls from fusiform rust.

References

Moths described in 1979
ebeli